A Christmas Gift for You from Phil Spector (originally released as A Christmas Gift for You from Philles Records) is an album of Christmas songs, produced by Phil Spector, and originally released as Philles 4005 in November 1963. Spector treated a series of mostly secular Christmas standards to his "Wall of Sound" treatment, and the selections feature the vocal performances of Spector's regular artists during this period. One month after its release, the album peaked at No. 13 on Billboard magazine's special, year-end, weekly Christmas Albums sales chart.

In 2003, the album was voted No. 142 on Rolling Stone magazine's list of the 500 greatest albums of all time, maintaining the rating in a 2012 revised list. In 2017, it was ranked the 130th greatest album of the 1960s by Pitchfork. In 2019, it was ranked the greatest Christmas album of all time by Rolling Stone. Brian Wilson of the Beach Boys has cited this album as his favorite of all time. The album was included in Robert Dimery's 1001 Albums You Must Hear Before You Die.

Recording and production

The album was recorded during September and October 1963. Brian Wilson of the Beach Boys attempted to contribute his piano playing to "Santa Claus Is Coming to Town", but was rejected because of his low performing ability. Cher, on the 4/20/2021 episode of The Late Show with Stephen Colbert, talked about attending the recording sessions with her then-boyfriend, Sonny Bono. Phil Spector had her sing background vocals for the entire Christmas album. Also, when Darlene Love didn't show up for the session, Spector had her record background vocals for "You've Lost That Lovin' Feeling" by The Righteous Brothers.

Release history
The album has been released several times on different labels: the original release on Philles and the 1972 reissue on Apple were followed by additional reissues on Warner-Spector (1974; this was the first release to feature a stereo mix of the songs, although it ironically used the "Back to Mono" Apple cover), Pavilion–a short-lived imprint of CBS (1981, also in stereo, using the Apple artwork, but with the "Back to Mono" button airbrushed out), Impression (1983), Passport (1984), and Rhino (1987).

The first CD issue was also on Rhino in 1987, co-credited to Phil Spector International RNCD 70235, it was mastered by Bill Inglot and Ken Perry and it restored the album's original mono mix.  The second CD issue was in 1987 as well, on Chrysalis (CCD 1625) in monophonic for the UK market. This one is co-credited "Spector Records International" and features the slightly different international artwork, it features the same mastering as the Rhino CD. The more common third CD issue came in 1989, a remastered release on ABKCO which restored the original title, artwork, and mono mix, this edition was remastered by Phil Spector and Larry Levine. The album also appeared as the fourth disc of ABKCO's 1991 Spector box set, Back to Mono, and as the second disc of the 2006 UK-only ABKCO compilation The Phil Spector Collection.

Sony Music took over distribution rights to the Philles Records catalog in 2009 and re-released the mono album, remastered by Bob Ludwig, on its Legacy Recordings imprint on October 27 of that year. (The Sundazed label also reissued the album on vinyl in 2009.) In 2012, Legacy Recordings released a two-disc set in the UK only, containing a new remastering of the mono album by Vic Anesini on the first disc and a selection of non-Christmas Spector hits and rarities on the second disc.

Reception

The album, released in the United States on November 22, 1963—the same day that President John F. Kennedy was assassinated—was a relative failure at the time. Original pressings are scarce and collectable, now selling for $400–$500 in excellent condition.

In subsequent years, especially after its reissue on Apple, the album grew in popularity and is considered now to be a holiday classic. Several of its tracks became iconic Christmas songs for generations, such as the original single "Christmas (Baby Please Come Home)," and the well-known "Ring-a-ling-a-ling Ding-dong-ding" background vocals in the Ronettes' "Sleigh Ride". The arrangement of Bruce Springsteen's version of "Santa Claus Is Comin' to Town" is based in part on the Crystals' version of the song, and U2's late-1980s remake of "Christmas (Baby Please Come Home)" that appeared on the first A Very Special Christmas album is patterned after the Darlene Love original that appeared on the Spector LP. The Ronettes' versions of "Frosty The Snowman" and "I Saw Mommy Kissing Santa Claus" also usually get some radio airplay during the holiday season.

Commercial performance
The album was reissued by Apple Records in 1972, with different cover art—a photograph of Spector dressed as a heavily bearded Santa Claus, wearing a "Back to Mono" button—and retitled Phil Spector's Christmas Album.  This version of the album went to No. 6 on Billboard'''s special Christmas Albums sales chart in December of that year, which was its highest chart ranking.

In 1972, the album made its debut on the UK Albums Chart; it would re-chart in 1983, peaking at No. 19.

On the week ending December 15, 2018, A Christmas Gift for You from Phil Spector entered the main Billboard 200 albums chart for the first time (at position No. 48), eventually peaking at No. 12 three weeks later. At the same time, the Ronettes' recording of "Sleigh Ride", though never released as a single, charted on the Billboard Hot 100 for the first time, initially reaching as high as No. 26 on the week ending January 5, 2019; it then re-charted during the 2019 and 2020 holiday seasons and attained an overall peak position of No. 13 on the week ending January 2, 2021, before rising to No. 10 during the following holiday season. The album itself returned to No. 12 on the Billboard 200 chart on the chart dated January 2, 2021, and rose to No. 10 one year later (on the chart dated January 8, 2022). Then in early January 2023, the album achieved an overall peak position of No. 8.

Track listingRecorded at Gold Star recording studio''

Personnel
Session musicians

 Production
 Mastering (1987 CDs) – Bill Inglot, Ken Perry at K-Disc Mastering
 Remastering (1989) – Phil Spector, Larry Levine
 Remastering (2009) – Bob Ludwig at Gateway Mastering
 Remastering (2012) – Vic Anesini

Charts

Weekly charts

Year-end charts

Certifications

References

Sources

 
 

1963 Christmas albums
Christmas albums by American artists
Albums produced by Phil Spector
Grammy Hall of Fame Award recipients
Christmas compilation albums
1963 compilation albums
Philles Records compilation albums
Covers albums
Albums arranged by Jack Nitzsche
Albums recorded at Gold Star Studios
Pop Christmas albums
Rock Christmas albums
Rhythm and blues Christmas albums